Marek Kopelent (28 April 193212 March 2023) was a Czech composer, music editor and academic teacher, who is considered to have been at the forefront of the "New Music" movement, and was one of the most-published Czech composers of the second half of the 20th century.

After studies in Prague, he worked as a music editor. In 1959 he became interested in European avantgarde music and incorporated its developments in his style. He received international recognition when his String Quartet No. 3 was performed at festivals throughout Europe. He co-founded and directed a contemporary music ensemble in Prague, Musica Viva Pragensis, and composed chamber music for them. He studied further for one year in West Berlin on a scholarship by Deutscher Akademischer Austausch Dienst. When he returned, politics had changed to censorship of contemporary music; he lost his job, and his music was banned. For 15 years, he worked as an accompanist at a music school, and composed pieces for foreign commissions that he could not hear being performed. In 1989, he was able to return, and was appointed professor of composition at the Academy of Fine Arts in Prague. He was chairman of the Czech section of the International Society for Contemporary Music.

His compositions focus on chamber music, concertante music, and vocal music from solo songs to oratorios, based on a wide range of texts from medieval to contemporary. He received international awards.

Life and career

Early life 
Kopelent was born in Prague, Czechoslovakia, on 28 April 1932. His father František Kopelent was a lawyer, and his mother was a French teacher. The boy and his sister were schooled in French. From 1951 to 1955 Kopelent studied composition with Jaroslav Řídký at the Academy of Performing Arts in Prague. He followed the late-Romantic style of his teacher in an orchestral piece concluding his studies, Satanela. He then worked from 1956 as a music editor for contemporary music for the Supraphon publishing house.

1959 
From 1959 Kopelent noticed increasingly the styles of the Second Viennese School and the European avant-garde movement. He read  books such as Ctirad Kohoutek's New Compositional Theories of Western European Music (Prague 1962), listened at the Warsaw Autumn to music and met Czech composers, Witold Lutosławski, Krzysztof Penderećki and others, and had personal contacts with Western European composers including Luigi Nono and Karlheinz Stockhausen. He absorbed influences and reflected them in his works. The first piece to come to the attention of the musical world outside of Czechoslovakia was his Third String Quartet (1963), in large part due to the interpretation of the piece by the Novák Quartet which performed it throughout Europe. In the 1960s, Kopelent became well known in contemporary European music circles, with his compositions being performed at such festivals as Warsaw Autumn, Donaueschinger Musiktage, Wittener Tage für neue Kammermusik and the annual Darmstädter Ferienkurse.

1965–1973 
From 1965 to 1973, Kopelent served as an artistic director of the contemporary music ensemble Musica Viva Pragensis, which had been founded by Petr Kotík in 1961. It was conducted by his colleague Zbyněk Vostřák, and for which he wrote several chamber pieces for the ensemble. In the Prague musical life of the 1960s, both the ensemble and the composers associated with it rose in importance, developing into the Prague Group of New Music, which brought together composers, musicologists and players, in opposition to the official Czech composers' association.

In 1969 Kopelent accepted a scholarship from the Deutscher Akademischer Austausch Dienst, which included a one-year artistic internship (Berliner Künstlerprogram) in West Berlin. In the meantime, the situation in Czechoslovakia changed following the Prague Spring, and New Music was less accepted. In 1971 Kopelent lost his job as editor, and his music was banned by the Czechoslovak government for twenty years. He was ostracized by the new Union of Composers, and his ensemble Musica viva Pragensis was not permitted by the authorities to pursue its concert activity.

1976 
In 1976 Kopelent accepted a job as a piano accompanist for a children's dance schools in Radotin, where he remained for 15 years. During the 1970s he composed many pieces, a number of them for foreign commissions, but, as he could not leave Czechoslovakia, he was unable to hear their performances.

1989 
After the Velvet Revolution in 1989, Kopelent became a music advisor in the office of president Váćlav Havel. In 1991 he was appointed professor of composition at the musical faculty of Academy of Fine Arts in Prague, a position he retained. He was a co-founder and chairman of the Czech section of the International Society for Contemporary Music, and was chairman of the Atelier 90 composers' association.

Kopelent was the organiser and a regular lecturer to International Composers' Summer Courses, held in Český Krumlov. Among his students were Czech composer , recipient of a stabat mater at the national competition of young composers, Czech composer , First Prize in the 1993 national competition of young composers, Ukrainian composer Svitlana Azarova, and Latvian composer Ēriks Ešenvalds.

Kopelent died in Prague on 12 March 2023, at age 90, at the Motol University Hospital after a short illness.

Compositions 
Kopelent's works include five string quartets, oratorios and concertante works. They have appeared in a number of compilations of Czech composers. He was one of the most-published Czech composers in the second half of the 20th century.

His works include:

Orchestral and vocal orchestral works 
 Satanela, symphonic poem for orchestra, based on a poem by Jaroslav Vrchlický (1954–55), Library of the Academy of Music
 Symphony (1982), Breitkopf & Härtel
 Pazdravení (Greetings), overture (1984), Breitkopf & Härtel
 Chléb a Ptáci (Bread and Birds), cantata for contralto, recitation, mixed choir and orchestra, text: poem by Jan Skácel (1957–62), Czech Music Fund (CHF)
 Laudatio pacis, by P. H. Dittrich (Germany), Sofia Gubaydulina (USSR) and Kopelent, oratorio for soprano, contralto, tenor, bass and recitation soloists, chamber choir, mixed choir and orchestra to texts by Jan Amos Komenský (Comenius) (1975)
 Legend – "De passione St. Adalberti Martyris", oratorio for recitation, mixed choir and orchestra to a Latin text of an ancient Bohemian legend (1981), CHF
 Ona skutecne jest (She Really Exists), for tenor, bass, recitation, mixed choir, children's choir and orchestra, text by Vladimír Holan (1985–86)
 Messaggio della bontà, oratorio for soprano and baritone, recitation, children's choir, mixed choir and orchestra (1987), Breitkopf & Härtel
 Lux mirandae sanctitatis, oratorio for soprano, recitation, mixed choir, children's choir and instrumental ensemble (1994), Supraphon (SU)
 Judex ergo for Requiem of Reconciliation, 1995
 ARÍÍJAh, for orchestra, (1996)
 ZASTŘENÝ HLAS NAD HLADINOU KLIDU (A Dimmed Voice Above the Level of Calm), for trumpet and chamber orchestra (2000)

Concertante compositions 
 Appassionato, for piano and orchestra (1970–71), Breitkopf & Härtel
 Sváry, for a group of twelve instruments and orchestra (1968), CHF
 A Few Minutes With an Oboist, concerto galante for oboe and chamber ensemble (1972), Breitkopf & Härtel
 Hrátky (Games), for alto saxophone and orchestra (1974–75), Breitkopf & Härtel
 Il canto de li augei, arias for soprano and orchestra to Italian lyrics by Renaissance poets (1977–78), Breitkopf & Härtel
 Libá hubda s sidovým motivem (Likeable Music With a Folkmotif, concerto for dulcimer and orchestra (1976), Breitkopf & Härtel
 Concertino for cor anglais and chamber ensemble (or orchestra) (1984), Breitkopf & Härtel
 Musique concertante, for cello, 12 cellos and orchestra (1991), SU

Music for chamber orchestra or ensemble 
 Rozjímání (Contemplation), for chamber orchestra (1966), Breitkopf & Härtel + SU'
 Nénie (Nänie) with flute for the late Hana Hlavsová, for flute, nine female voices and chamber ensemble (1960–61), Schott Music Panton (PA)
 String Quartet No. 3 (1963), SU
 Quintet for oboe, clarinet, bassoon, viola and piano, Breitkopf & Härtel
 Pocta Vladimíru Holanovi  (A Tribute to Vladimír Holan) for nonet (1965)
 String Quartet No. 4 (1967), Breitkopf & Härtel
 Zátiší (Still Life) for chamber ensemble (1968), Breitkopf & Härtel
 Intimissimo, music and a poem for chamber ensemble and tape recording (2 reciters) of a poem by Paul Fort (1971), Breitkopf & Härtel, Styrian Autumn 
 Brass Quintet (1972), Breitkopf & Härtel
 Sonata for 11 stringed instruments (1972–73), Breitkopf & Härtel
 Rondo "Před příchodem roztomilých katů aneb trojí klanění naději" ("Before the Arrival of the Charming Executioners" or "Three Bows to Hope") for five percussion instruments (1973), Breitkopf & Härtel
 Toccata for harp, harpsichord and dulcimer (or el. guitar) (1974), Breitkopf & Härtel
 Triste a consolante for wind quintet of new or early instruments ad lib. (1977), Breitkopf & Härtel
 Musica lirica for flute, violin and piano (1978–79)
 Furiant for piano trio (1979)
 String Quartet No. 5 (1979–80), Breitkopf & Härtel
 Êtres fins en mouvement for 6 percussionists (1987), Breitkopf & Härtel
 Eines Tages, for 6 cellos (1987), Breitkopf & Härtel 
 Romanze for 2 pianos (one tuned a quarter tone lower) (1991), SU
 Le petit rien, for piccolo flute and percussion (1991)

Music for solo instruments 
 Pro Arnošta Wilda, for piano (1966), Breitkopf & Härtel
 Hallelujah, for organ (1967), Breitkopf & Härtel
 Bijou de bohème for harpsichord (1967), Breitkopf & Härtel
 Ballad for piano (1976), Breitkopf & Härtel
 Capriccio for trumpet (1976), Breitkopf & Härtel
 Jitřní chvalozpěv (Lob in der Frühe, Morning Eulogy) for organ (1978), Breitkopf & Härtel
 Canto intimo for flute and vibraphone (1963), Edition Modern, Munich
 Musique piquante for violin and dulcimer (or piano) (1971), Breitkopf & Härtel
 Toccata for viola and piano (1978), Breitkopf & Härtel
 Le petit rien, for piccolo and percussion (1991)
 Karrak for cello and piano (1991)
 Canto espansivo for clarinet (1993), SU
 Per Aminko for harpsichord (1998), Ritornel
 Cantus rogas for cello (1990)
 Der Gnade Freude (Radosti z milosti) for organ (1999)

Vocal music 
 Písně rozhořčené (Angry Songs) for baritone and piano to poems by Petrarca (1956), CHF
 Miniaturní písně (Miniature Songs) for baritone and piano to ancient Japanese poems (1960–61)
 Snehah for soprano, jazz contralto (from a tape recording), tape recording and chamber ensemble (1967), SU
 Bludný hlas (Irrende Stimme, Errant Voice) for an actress, tape recording, chamber ensemble, film (35 or 16 mm) and light ad lib. (1969), 
 Black and White Tears for solo voice (1972), Breitkopf & Härtel
 Nářek ženy (A Woman's Lament), melodrama for an actress, 7 brass instruments, 14 female voices and a children´s choir, texts by the composer and M. Procházková (1980), CHF
 Vrh kostek (The Casting of Dice), for 4 reciters and tape, to a poem by Mallarmé (1980)
 Zjitřený zpěv (Excited Song) for baritone and brass quintet, text by Josef Hora (1982–83), CHF
 Agnus Dei, for soprano and chamber ensemble to texts by Martin Luther (1983), Breitkopf & Härtel
 Mon Amour,  for soprano, tenor, chamber ensemble, and female choir, to texts by Marc Chagall (1988), SU
 Der Augenblick for soprano, flute and piano, to texts by Andreas Gryphius (1989), SU
 Le chant du merle au détenu, for mezzosoprano, flute, accordion and piano, to poems by Jan Zahradníček (1991), SU
 Holanovská reminiscence for mezzo-soprano, recitation, choir, clarinet, trombone and piano, to poems by Vladimír Holan (1995)
 Cantus de dilectione filiarum Dei for 5 sopranos, baritone, and 3 trombones to texts by Thérèse de Lisieux (1998)
 Ze zápisníku Nataši H. (From the Notebook of Natasjy H., nine fragments for soprano and baritone, to texts by the mentally handicapped Natasja Hamouzová (2000)

Choral music 
 Matka (Mother), frescoes for mixed choir with flute (1964), Pa and DGG (Deutsche Gramophongesellschaft) 11'
 Modlitby kamene (Stone Prayer) for a reciter, 2 mixed chamber choirs and 3 tom-toms, to a poem by Vladimír Holan (1967), Breitkopf & Härtel
 Žaloby (Klagen, Complaints) for mixed choir, trumpet and timpani ad lib. (1969), Breitkopf & Härtel
 Syllabes mouvementées (Syllables on the Move) for chamber choir (12 voices), (1972)
 Vacillat pes meus (I Stumble) for mixed choir to words from the Book of Psalms (1973), Breitkopf & Härtel
 Píseň kratochvilná (Amusing Song) for mixed choir, to a text by the Bohemian chronicler Lukáš Volný (1982)
 Regina lucis, for mixed choir to a text from the Czech Franus hymnal from the late l5th century (1985), Breitkopf & Härtel
 Cantus supplex for 12 vocalists to a medieval text (1966), Breitkopf & Härtel
 Alouette for 12 vocalists to the poem by Carmen Bernos de Gasztold (1990), SU
 Cantus pro defunctis, for medium voice (1994), SU
 Appels for 12 vocalists and 3 percussion players (1996)
 Cantus de navitate filii for medium (or low) voices (1997)

Music for children's choir 
 Four Songs to poems by VÍTĚZSLAV NEZVAL, for children's choir and piano (1960)
 Dotty Ditties for children's choir, to texts by the composer (1967)
 Svítání (Daybreak), for a large children's choir (1975), SU
 Cantus simplex, for children's choir (1983)

Stage works 
 Musica, or: A Story of Long, Long Ago That Angels Pass On From Age to Age'', singspiel for soprano, 2 actors, flute, oboe and harpsichord, to a text by Bohumil Sobotka  (1978–79), Bärenreiter

Awards 
In 1991, Kopelent was honoured by the French government, which named him a Chevalier des arts et des lettres. He received the Czech Classic Award in 1999, the Herder Prize in 2001, and a Czech State Award for his lifelong contribution to Czech music in 2003.

References

External links 
 

1932 births
2023 deaths
Czech composers
Czech male composers
Musicians from Prague
Academic staff of the Academy of Fine Arts, Prague
Recipients of Medal of Merit (Czech Republic)
Chevaliers of the Ordre des Arts et des Lettres
Herder Prize recipients